SWH may refer to:

 Sai Wan Ho station, Hong Kong, MTR station code SWH
 Sapir–Whorf hypothesis that the structure of a language affects the ways in which its speakers conceptualize their world.
 Significant wave height, in physical oceanography, the mean wave height (trough to crest) of the highest third of the waves.
 Solar water heating
 Spot World Heritage, a satellite data distribution scheme.
 Software Heritage
 Swan Hill Airport, IATA airport code "SWH"